Chatara is a village, in Sahid Matangini CD block in Tamluk subdivision of Purba Medinipur district in the state of West Bengal, India.

Geography

CD block HQ
The headquarters of this CD block are located here.

Urbanisation
94.08% of the population of Tamluk subdivision live in the rural areas. Only 5.92% of the population live in the urban areas, and that is the second lowest proportion of urban population amongst the four subdivisions in Purba Medinipur district, just above Egra subdivision.

Note: The map alongside presents some of the notable locations in the subdivision. All places marked in the map are linked in the larger full screen map.

Demographics
As per 2011 Census of India Chatara had a total population of 4,868 of which 2,498 (51%) were males and 2,370 (49%) were females. Population below 6 years was 551. The total number of literates in Chatara was 3,869 (89.62% of the population over 6 years).

Transport
Mecheda-Tamluk-Haldia Road passes through Chatara.

References

Villages in Purba Medinipur district